Poems, Chiefly in the Scottish Dialect, commonly known as the Kilmarnock Edition, is a collection of poetry by the Scottish poet Robert Burns, first printed and issued by John Wilson of Kilmarnock on 31 July 1786. It was the first published edition of Burns' work. It cost three shillings and 612 copies were printed. The volume was dedicated to Gavin Hamilton. 

Besides satire, the Kilmarnock volume contains a number of poems such as "Halloween" (written in 1785), "The Twa Dogs" and "The Cotter's Saturday Night", which are vividly descriptive of the Scots peasant life with which Burns was most familiar; and a group such as "Puir Mailie" and "To a Mouse", which, in the tenderness of their treatment of animals, revealed one of the most attractive sides of Burns' personality. Six of the original manuscript versions of the poems from the book are in the possession of the Irvine Burns Club.

In 1787, Burns travelled to Edinburgh with the intention of organizing a second edition and, after being introduced to publisher William Creech and printer William Smellie, 3,000 copies of the Poems, Chiefly in the Scottish Dialect (Edinburgh Edition) were published in April 1787.

Facsimiles

Only 612 copies of the Poems, Chiefly in the Scottish Dialect were printed by John Wilson in 1786 and the publisher James McKie saw that most collectors of Robert Burns's works would be unable to acquire a copy and to satisfy this demand and satisfy his own interests as an admirer of Burns he produced the first facsimile edition for collectors in 1867 in a print run of 600 copies. These facsimiles were in original style boards, signed by James McKie.

A miniature facsimile issued in a protective case with a magnifying glass in the 1890s and was of benefit to troops in the trenches in World War I due to its protective case and convenient size.

Contents 
Source:
 The Twa Dogs, a Tale
 Scotch Drink
 The Author's earnest cry and prayer, to the right honorable and honorable, the Scotch representatives in the House of Commons
 The Holy Fair
 Address to the Deil
 The death and dying words of Poor Maillie
 Poor Mallie's Elegy
 To J. S****
 A Dream
 The Vision
 Halloween
 The auld Farmer's new-year-morning Salutation, to his auld Mare, Maggy, on giving her the accustomed ripp of Corn to hansel in the new year
 The Cotter's Saturday Night, inscribed to R. A. Esq
 To a Mouse, on turning her up in her Nest, with the Plough, November, 1785
 Epistle to Davie, a brother Poet
 The Lament, occasioned by the unfortunate issue of a friend's amour
 Despondency, an Ode
 Man was made to mourn, a Dirge
 Winter, a Dirge
 A Prayer in the prospect of Death
 To a Mountain-Daisy, on turning one down, with the Plough, in April, 1786
 To Ruin
 Epistle to a young Friend
 On a Scotch Bard gone to the West Indies
 A Dedication to G. H. Esq
 To a Louse, on seeing one on a Lady's bonnet at Church
 Epistle to J. L*****k, an old Scotch Bard
 Epistle to the same
 Epistle to W. S*****n, Ochiltree
 Epistle to J. R******, enclosing some Poems
 Song, It was upon a Lammas night
 Song, Now westlin winds, and flaught'ring guns
 Song, From thee, Eliza, I must go
 The Farewell
 Epitaphs and Epigrams
 A Bard's Epitaph

See also 

 Address to the Deil
 To a Mountain Daisy
 Epitaph for James Smith
 Poems, Chiefly in the Scottish Dialect (Edinburgh Edition)
 Poems, Chiefly in the Scottish Dialect (Second Edinburgh Edition)
 Poems, Chiefly in the Scottish Dialect (London Edition)
 Poems, Chiefly in the Scottish Dialect (Dublin Variant)
 Robert Burns World Federation
 Burns Clubs
 Poems by David Sillar
 Glenriddell Manuscripts

References

External links
Digitised copy of Poems, chiefly in the Scottish dialect from the Kilmarnock edition printed by John Wilson (1786) from National Library of Scotland. JPEG, PDF, XML versions.
 Corpus of Modern Scottish Writing digital versions of the Kilmarnock edition

Robert Burns
British poetry collections